Group B of the 2013 FIBA Asia Championship took place from 1 to 3 August 2013. This is the preliminary round of the 2013 FIBA Asia Championship, with the three teams with the best records advance to 2013 FIBA Asia Championship Group E.

FIBA Asia eventually decided not to issue a replacement. This caused the remaining teams to qualify automatically to the second round.

Summary
Qatar and Japan fought to a close opening game, which was won by the Qataris after Jarvis Hayes split his free throws with eight seconds remaining to provide the winning margin. The two teams then easily won over Hong Kong. All three teams qualified to the second round.

Standings

|}

All times are local (UTC+8).

August 1

Japan vs. Qatar

|-
|4 ||align=left|Keijuro Matsui || 8 || 1/5 || 20 || 0/0 || 0 || 0/0 || 0 || 0 || 0 || 0 || 1 || 1 || 0 || 0 || 0 || 3
|-
|5 ||align=left|Daiki Tanaka || 14 || 1/3 || 33.3 || 1/2 || 50 || 0/0 || 0 || 0 || 0 || 0 || 0 || 1 || 0 || 0 || 0 || 2
|-
|6 ||align=left|Makoto Hiejima || 20 || 2/8 || 25 || 1/5 || 20 || 0/0 || 0 || 1 || 1 || 2 || 4 || 1 || 2 || 2 || 1 || 5
|-
|7 ||align=left|Atsuya Ota || 1 || 0/0 || 0 || 0/0 || 0 || 0/0 || 0 || 0 || 0 || 0 || 1 || 2 || 0 || 0 || 0 || 0
|-
|8 ||align=left|Yuta Watanabe ||colspan=16 align=left|Did not play
|-
|9 ||align=left|Takahiro Kurihara || 26 || 3/5 || 60 || 2/3 || 66.7 || 0/0 || 0 || 1 || 2 || 3 || 1 || 3 || 1 || 1 || 0 || 7
|-
|10 ||align=left|Kosuke Takeuchi || 35 || 3/12 || 25 || 3/12 || 25 || 4/6 || 66.7 || 3 || 7 || 10 || 0 || 2 || 1 || 0 || 1 || 10
|-
|11 ||align=left|Ryota Sakurai || 20 || 0/3 || 0 || 0/3 || 0 || 3/4 || 75 || 0 || 3 || 3 || 5 || 0 || 1 || 0 || 0 || 3
|-
|12 ||align=left|J.R. Sakuragi || 30 || 5/12 || 41.7 || 5/11 || 45.5 || 3/3 || 100 || 1 || 7 || 8 || 1 || 5 || 1 || 0 || 0 || 13
|-
|13 ||align=left|Naoto Tsuji ||colspan=16 align=left|Did not play
|-
|14 ||align=left|Kosuke Kanamaru || 32 || 10/13 || 76.9 || 6/8 || 75 || 3/3 || 100 || 0 || 4 || 4 || 0 || 4 || 1 || 0 || 0 || 27
|-
|15 ||align=left|Hiroshi Ichioka || 14 || 2/3 || 66.7 || 2/3 || 66.7 || 0/1 || 0 || 2 || 3 || 5 || 0 || 2 || 0 || 1 || 0 || 4
|-
|align=left colspan=2|Totals || 200 || 27/64 || 42.2 || 20/47 || 42.6 || 13/17 || 76.5 || 9 || 29 || 38 || 13 || 21 || 8 || 4 || 2 || 74
|}

|-
|4 ||align=left|Mansour El Hadary || 23 || 3/4 || 75 || 3/3 || 100 || 2/2 || 100 || 0 || 0 || 0 || 0 || 2 || 2 || 0 || 0 || 8
|-
|5 ||align=left|Jarvis Hayes || 36 || 6/15 || 40 || 5/13 || 38.5 || 7/8 || 87.5 || 0 || 6 || 6 || 1 || 3 || 2 || 0 || 0 || 20
|-
|6 ||align=left|Abdulrahman Saad ||colspan=16 align=left|Did not play
|-
|7 ||align=left|Daoud Musa || 17 || 3/9 || 33.3 || 0/1 || 0 || 0/0 || 0 || 0 || 2 || 2 || 1 || 2 || 0 || 0 || 0 || 3
|-
|8 ||align=left|Khalid Suliman || 25 || 3/9 || 33.3 || 1/5 || 20 || 1/2 || 50 || 1 || 1 || 2 || 0 || 2 || 1 || 0 || 0 || 9
|-
|9 ||align=left|Ali Turki Ali || 17 || 1/2 || 50 || 0/1 || 0 || 0/0 || 0 || 0 || 2 || 2 || 1 || 2 || 0 || 0 || 0 || 3
|-
|10 ||align=left|Yasseen Musa || 33 || 4/7 || 57.1 || 3/5 || 60 || 3/6 || 50 || 7 || 8 || 15 || 4 || 4 || 1 || 0 || 1 || 12
|-
|11 ||align=left|Erfan Ali Saeed || 32 || 4/14 || 28.6 || 2/7 || 28.6 || 4/4 || 100 || 3 || 3 || 6 || 1 || 2 || 2 || 0 || 3 || 14
|-
|12 ||align=left|Mohammed Saleem Abdulla ||colspan=16 align=left|Did not play
|-
|13 ||align=left|Mohammed Yousef || 13 || 0/6 || 0 || 0/4 || 0 || 0/0 || 0 || 0 || 3 || 3 || 1 || 2 || 0 || 0 || 0 || 0
|-
|14 ||align=left|Malek Saleem || 1 || 0/0 || 0 || 0/0 || 0 || 0/0 || 0 || 0 || 0 || 0 || 0 || 1 || 0 || 0 || 0 || 0
|-
|15 ||align=left|Baker Ahmad Mohammed || 3 || 0/0 || 0 || 0/0 || 0 || 0/0 || 0 || 1 || 1 || 2 || 0 || 0 || 1 || 0 || 0 || 0
|-
|align=left colspan=2|Totals || 200 || 24/66 || 36.4 || 14/39 || 35.9 || 17/22 || 77.3 || 14 || 31 || 45 || 11 || 20 || 11 || 0 || 4 || 75
|}

August 2

Japan vs. Hong Kong

|-
|4 ||align=left|Keijuro Matsui || 3|| 03|| 0|| 0/1|| 0|| 0/0|| 0|| 0|| 0|| 0|| 0|| 0|| 0|| 0|| 0||0
|-
|5 ||align=left|Daiki Tanaka || 20|| 1/2|| 50|| 1/1|| 100|| 4/4|| 100|| 0|| 1|| 1|| 1|| 0|| 0|| 1|| 0||6
|-
|6 ||align=left|Makoto Hiejima || 23|| 3/6|| 50|| 3/6|| 50|| 0/0|| 0|| 0|| 2|| 2|| 3|| 3|| 2|| 1|| 0||6
|-
|7 ||align=left|Atsuya Ota || 13|| 2/2|| 100|| 2/2|| 100|| 0/1|| 0|| 0|| 1|| 1|| 2|| 1|| 1|| 0|| 0||4
|-
|8 ||align=left|Yuta Watanabe || 6|| 1/4|| 25|| 1/4|| 25|| 2/4|| 50|| 1|| 0|| 1|| 1|| 0|| 1|| 1|| 0||4
|-
|9 ||align=left|Takahiro Kurihara || 8|| 1/3|| 33.3|| 1/2|| 50|| 0/0|| 0|| 0|| 1|| 1|| 1|| 1|| 1|| 1|| 0||2
|-
|10 ||align=left|Kosuke Takeuchi || 21|| 6/9|| 66.7|| 6/9|| 66.7|| 0/0|| 0|| 3|| 4|| 7|| 0|| 1|| 0|| 0|| 1||12
|-
|11 ||align=left|Ryota Sakurai || 21|| 1/3|| 33.3|| 1/3|| 33.3|| 0/0|| 0|| 1|| 2|| 3|| 4|| 2|| 0|| 0||0 || 2
|-
|12 ||align=left|J.R. Sakuragi || 23|| 5/9|| 55.6|| 5/9|| 55.6|| 0/0|| 0|| 4|| 8|| 12|| 2|| 1|| 1|| 0|| 1||10
|-
|13 ||align=left|Naoto Tsuji || 21|| 6/11|| 54.5|| 2/3|| 66.7|| 1/1|| 100|| 0|| 3|| 3|| 3|| 2|| 1|| 1|| 0||17
|-
|14 ||align=left|Kosuke Kanamaru || 19|| 3/8|| 37.5|| 1/5|| 20|| 2/2|| 100|| 0|| 5|| 5|| 1|| 1|| 1|| 0|| 0||10
|-
|15 ||align=left|Hiroshi Ichioka || 23|| 0/2|| 0|| 0/2|| 0|| 3/4|| 75|| 1|| 4|| 5|| 2|| 3|| 3|| 0|| 0||3
|-
|align=left colspan=2|Totals || 200|| 29/62|| 46.8|| 23/47|| 48.9|| 12/16|| 75|| 10|| 32|| 42|| 20|| 15|| 11|| 5|| 2||76
|}

|-
|4 ||align=left|Man Chun Lam ||  9||  0/4||  0||  0/2||  0||  0/0||  0||  1||  3||  4||  1||  1||  3||  0||  0|| 0
|-
|5 ||align=left|Tsz Lai Lau ||  6||  0/2||  0||  0/1||  0||  0/0||  0||  0||  0||  0||  0||  0||  0||  0||  0|| 0
|-
|6 ||align=left|Ki Lee ||colspan=16 align=left|Did not play
|-00
|7 ||align=left|Kim Wong Li ||  26||  3/8||  37.5||  2/5||  40||  2/2||  100||  1||  1||  2||  2||  1||  1||  0||  0|| 9
|-
|8 ||align=left|Siu Wing Chan ||  20||  2/5||  40||  1/3||  33.3||  0/0||  0||  1||  0||  1||  0||  3||  3||  0||  0|| 5
|-
|9 ||align=left|Tung Leung Lau ||  14||  1/3||  33.3||  1/3||  33.3||  0/0||  0||  2||  2||  4||  0||  2||  2||  0||  0|| 2
|-
|10 ||align=left|Yik Lun Chan ||  32||  3/14||  21.4||  1/6||  16.7||  0/0||  0||  2||  2||  4||  0||  1||  1||  1||  0|| 8
|-
|11 ||align=left|Chi Ho Poon ||colspan=16 align=left|Did not play
|-
|12 ||align=left|Shing Yee Fong ||  27||  0/2||  0||  0/2||  0||  0/0||  0||  2||  6||  8||  2||  4||  0||  0||  0|| 0
|-
|13 ||align=left|Chun Wai Wong ||  30||  8/15||  53.3||  4/7||  57.1||  3/7||  42.9||  0||  3||  3||  1||  4||  1||  0||  0|| 23
|-
|14 ||align=left|Duncan Overbeck Reid ||  30||  5/13||  38.5||  5/13||  38.5||  0/0||  0||  5||  5||  10||  7||  2||  3||  2||  0|| 10
|-
|15 ||align=left|Wai Kit Szeto ||  6||  1/3||  33.3||  1/3||  33.3||  0/0||  0||  1||  1||  2||  0||  0||  0||  0||  0|| 2
|-
|align=left colspan=2|Totals || 200|| 23/69|| 33.3|| 15/45|| 33.3|| 5/9|| 55.6|| 15|| 25|| 40|| 13|| 18|| 15|| 3|| 0||59
|}

August 3

Hong Kong vs. Qatar

|-
|4 ||align=left|Man Chun Lam ||  10||  1/3||  33||  1/2||  50||  0/0||  0||  0||  1||  1||  0||  1||  1||  1||  0|| 2
|-
|5 ||align=left|Tsz Lai Lau ||  12||  3/6||  50||  1/1||  100||  0/0||  0||  1||  1||  1||  0||  1||  0||  0||  0|| 8
|-
|6 ||align=left|Ki Lee ||  12||  1/6||  16.7||  0/2||  0||  0/0||  0||  0||  1||  1||  0||  1||  1||  0||  0|| 3
|-00
|7 ||align=left|Kim Wong Li ||  23||  2/4||  50||  2/4||  50||  0/0||  0||  1||  0||  1||  6||  0||  2||  0||  0|| 4
|-
|8 ||align=left|Siu Wing Chan ||  26||  6/11||  54.5||  1/2||  50||  1/2||  50||  1||  0||  1||  2||  3||  4||  2||  0|| 18
|-
|9 ||align=left|Tung Leung Lau ||  19||  2/6||  33.3||  2/6||  33.3||  0/0||  0||  1||  5||  6||  0||  0||  1||  1||  1|| 4
|-
|10 ||align=left|Yik Lun Chan ||  12||  0/3||  0||  0/0||  0||  0/0||  0||  0||  2||  2||  0||  1||  1||  0||  0|| 0
|-
|11 ||align=left|Chi Ho Poon ||colspan=16 align=left|Did not play
|-
|12 ||align=left|Shing Yee Fong ||  33||  4/8||  50||  4/8||  50||  0/0||  0||  2||  8||  10||  1||  3||  0||  1||  0|| 8
|-
|13 ||align=left|Chun Wai Wong ||  26||  3/11||  27.3||  2/6||  33.3||  2/2||  100||  2||  4||  6||  0||  2||  1||  0||  0|| 9
|-
|14 ||align=left|Duncan Overbeck Reid ||  22||  4/9||  44.4||  4/8||  50||  0/2||  0||  1||  4||  5||  2||  3||  0||  0||  0|| 8
|-
|15 ||align=left|Wai Kit Szeto ||  5||  0/0||  0||  0/0||  0||  0/0||  0||  0||  1||  1||  1||  1||  1||  0||  0|| 0
|-
|align=left colspan=2|Totals || 200|| 26/67|| 38.8|| 17/39|| 43.6|| 3/6|| 50|| 8|| 27|| 35|| 12|| 16|| 12|| 5|| 0|| 64
|}

|-
|4 ||align=left|Mansour El Hadary || 13|| 1/2|| 50|| 0/0|| 0|| 0/0|| 0|| 0|| 1|| 1|| 3|| 1|| 0|| 0|| 0||3
|-
|5 ||align=left|Jarvis Hayes || 24|| 10/13|| 76.9|| 5/7|| 71.4|| 0/1|| 0|| 1|| 1|| 2|| 0|| 1|| 1|| 1|| 0||25
|-
|6 ||align=left|Abdulrahman Saad || 21|| 1/10|| 10|| 0/2|| 0|| 1/2|| 50|| 3|| 6|| 9|| 3|| 0|| 2|| 0|| 0||4
|-
|7 ||align=left|Daoud Musa || 22|| 6/9|| 66.7|| 2/3|| 66.7|| 1/3|| 33.3||  3|| 2|| 5|| 3|| 0|| 4|| 0|| 0||17
|-
|8 ||align=left|Khalid Suliman || 14|| 2/6|| 33.3|| 2/2|| 100|| 3/4|| 75|| 0|| 2|| 2|| 1|| 0|| 1|| 0|| 0||7
|-
|9 ||align=left|Ali Turki Ali || 31|| 3/9|| 33.3|| 1/4|| 25|| 0/0|| 0|| 1|| 2|| 3|| 2|| 0|| 1|| 0|| 1||8
|-
|10 ||align=left|Yasseen Musa || 9|| 0/2|| 0|| 0/1|| 0|| 0/0|| 0|| 0|| 4|| 4|| 2|| 1|| 1|| 0|| 0||0
|-
|11 ||align=left|Erfan Ali Saeed || 13|| 2/2|| 100|| 1/1|| 100|| 0/0|| 0|| 1|| 3|| 4|| 2|| 1|| 0|| 0|| 0||5
|-
|12 ||align=left|Mohammed Saleem Abdulla || 11|| 2/5|| 40|| 2/4|| 50|| 3/4|| 75|| 3|| 2|| 5|| 0|| 0|| 0|| 0|| 0||7
|-
|13 ||align=left|Mohammed Yousef || 17|| 2/3|| 66.7|| 2/3|| 66.7|| 1/2|| 50|| 1|| 3|| 4|| 1|| 3|| 0|| 2|| 1||5
|-
|14 ||align=left|Malek Saleem || 16|| 1/7|| 14.3|| 0/1|| 0|| 0/0|| 0|| 0|| 4|| 4|| 2|| 1|| 2|| 0|| 0||3
|-
|15 ||align=left|Baker Ahmad Mohammed || 10|| 1/2|| 50|| 1/2|| 50|| 1/2|| 50|| 1|| 0|| 1|| 2|| 0|| 1|| 0|| 0||3
|-
|align=left colspan=2|Totals || 200|| 31/70|| 44.3|| 16/30|| 53.3|| 10/18|| 55.6|| 14|| 30|| 44|| 21|| 8|| 13|| 3|| 2|| 87
|}

References

Group B
2013–14 in Hong Kong basketball
2013 in Qatari sport
2013 in Japanese sport